Ben 10 is an American media franchise. It may refer to various releases in that franchise:

Television series
 Ben 10 (2005 TV series), a television series from 2005 to 2008
 Ben 10: Alien Force, a television series from 2008 to 2010
 Ben 10: Ultimate Alien, a television series from 2010 to 2012
 Ben 10: Omniverse, a television series from 2012 to 2014
 Ben 10 (2016 TV series), a reboot of the 2005 Cartoon Network series

Other media
 Ben 10: Secret of the Omnitrix, a 2007 film
 Ben 10: Race Against Time, a 2007 film
 Ben 10: Alien Swarm, a 2009 film
 Ben 10/Generator Rex: Heroes United, a 2011 crossover special
 Ben 10: Destroy All Aliens, a 2012 film

Other uses
 Accelerator (roller coaster) formerly known as Ben 10 – Ultimate Mission, a roller coaster at Drayton Manor Theme Park